A (US:) colter / (British:) coulter (Latin 'culter' = 'knife') is a vertically mounted component of many ploughs that cuts an edge about  deep ahead of a plowshare. Its most effective depth is determined by soil conditions.

History

Its earliest design consisted of a knife-like blade. In 2011 an early medieval coulter was excavated from a site in Kent, England. Coulters using a flat rotating disc began being used c. 1900. Its advantage was a smoothly cut bank, and it sliced plant debris to the width of the furrow.

Results
In his 1854 book, Henry Stephens used dynamometer measurements to conclude that a plough without a coulter took about the same amount of force to pull but using a coulter resulted in a much cleaner result. It softens the soil, allowing the plough to undercut the furrow made by the coulter.

Jointer

A rolling coulter has an optional accessory called a "jointer".  The jointer flips over a small part of the surface on top of the slice before the plowshare flips the main slice.  It ensures that all of the plant debris gets covered by the flipped slice.

References

Agricultural machinery
Ploughs